Red Bells (also known as Mexico in Flames, Insurgent Mexico and Red Bells Part I – Mexico on Fire) is a 1982 adventure-drama film directed by Sergei Bondarchuk. It was coproduced by Soviet Union (where it was released as Krasnye kolokola, film pervyy – Meksika v ogne), Italy (where is known as Messico in fiamme) and Mexico (where its title is Campanas rojas). It is the first of a two-part film centered on the life and career of John Reed, the revolutionary communist journalist that had already inspired Warren Beatty's Reds. This chapter focuses on Reed's reportage about  1915 Mexican revolution. It was followed by Red Bells II.

Cast 
 Franco Nero as John Reed
 Ursula Andress as Mabel Dodge
  as Emiliano Zapata
 Eraclio Zepeda as Pancho Villa
 Blanca Guerra as Isabel
 Sydne Rome as Louise Bryant

See also
Reed: Insurgent Mexico (1973)

References

External links

1982 films
Films directed by Sergei Bondarchuk
1982 drama films
Films about journalists
Films about Pancho Villa
Mexican multilingual films
1982 multilingual films
Soviet multilingual films
Italian multilingual films
1980s Russian-language films
English-language Soviet films
English-language Italian films
English-language Mexican films
1980s Spanish-language films
Mexican drama films
1980s Mexican films